The Brazilian luminous roughy (Aulotrachichthys atlanticus) is a slimehead from the family Trachichthyidae.

References

Brazilian luminous roughy
Fish of the Western Atlantic
Fish of Argentina
Fish of Brazil
Fish of Uruguay
Brazilian luminous roughy